The 1975 Ice Hockey World Championships were the 42nd Ice Hockey World Championships and the 53rd European Championships of ice hockey. The tournament took place in West Germany from 3 to 19 April and the games were played in Munich and Düsseldorf. Six teams took part in the main tournament, each playing each other twice. The Soviet Union won all of their games, and became World Champions for the fourteenth time, and won their 17th European title.

This year did not offer much in the way of drama, with the expected order of finish happening again, and the host not even playing in the top level tournament. This helped to change the player eligibility rules and change the format.  Finland narrowly missed a medal again, finishing fourth for the sixth straight year.

World Championship Group A (West Germany)

With Group A expanding to eight teams in 1976 no nation was relegated.

World Championship Group B (Japan)
Played in Sapporo 14–23 March.

With Group A expanding to eight teams in 1976, both East and West Germany were promoted, and no nation was relegated.  Canada had been offered a spot in Group A first, but they declined until 1977. Additionally, the top six nations qualified for the Innsbruck Olympics.

World Championship Group C (Bulgaria)
Played in Sofia 1–10 March.  China was supposed to participate but forfeited.

Norway and Bulgaria were promoted to Group B.

Ranking and statistics

Tournament Awards
Best players selected by the directorate:
Best Goaltender:       Jiří Holeček
Best Defenceman:       Pekka Marjamäki
Best Forward:          Alexander Yakushev
Media All-Star Team:
Goaltender:  Vladislav Tretiak
Defence:  Pekka Marjamäki,  Valeri Vasiliev
Forwards:  Vladimír Martinec,  Vladimir Petrov,  Alexander Yakushev

Final standings
The final standings of the tournament according to IIHF:

European championships final standings
The final standings of the European championships according to IIHF:

References

Complete results

IIHF Men's World Ice Hockey Championships
World Championships
I
1975
Ice Hockey World Championships
Sports competitions in Munich
Sports competitions in Dortmund
1970s in Munich
20th century in Dortmund
1970s in North Rhine-Westphalia
Ice Hockey World Championships
International ice hockey competitions hosted by Japan
Sports competitions in Sapporo
20th century in Sapporo
Sports competitions in Sofia
1970s in Sofia
World Championships
World Championships
International ice hockey competitions hosted by Bulgaria